The UEFA Golden Jubilee Poll is the popular name for an online poll conducted in 2004 by UEFA as part of their Golden Jubilee celebrations, celebrating the best European footballers from the fifty previous years. The poll, available on UEFA's website, asked respondents to pick their ten favorite players from each of the five previous decades, from a shortlist of 250 players. Over 150,000 people responded, producing over seven million votes. Zinedine Zidane topped the poll narrowly from Franz Beckenbauer. Italian players featured most frequently with ten nominations, edging out German players with eight nominations.

Full results

See also
FIFA 100
UEFA Jubilee Awards
UEFA Club Football Awards

External links
UEFA Golden Jubilee Poll Media Release
UEFA Awards

Golden Jubilee Poll
2003–04 in European football
2004–05 in European football